Peter Guzelj (born 20 April 1949 in Ljubljana) is a Yugoslav retired slalom canoeist who competed in the 1970s. He finished sixth in the C-2 event at the 1972 Summer Olympics in Munich.

References
 Sports-reference.com profile

1949 births
Canoeists at the 1972 Summer Olympics
Living people
Olympic canoeists of Yugoslavia
Yugoslav male canoeists
Slovenian male canoeists
Sportspeople from Ljubljana